Frédéric Dutoit (born 26 May 1956 in Marseille) is a French politician from the French Communist Party.

References

1956 births
Living people
Politicians from Marseille
Deputies of the 12th National Assembly of the French Fifth Republic
French Communist Party politicians